On May 5–8, 1965, a significant tornado outbreak affected much of the Central United States. For four consecutive days, tornado outbreaks produced at least three significant (F2+) tornadoes each day, and at least two violent (F4–F5) tornadoes on three of the four days. The entire sequence generated 37 significant tornadoes, including at least nine violent tornadoes, one of which was rated F5. On May 5, two F4s struck Iowa, including a long-tracked tornado family that injured 11 people. On May 6, an outbreak of six strong tornadoes, four of them violent F4s, affected Minneapolis and St. Paul, Minnesota, and has been nicknamed "The Longest Night", killing 13 people and causing major damages—at the time the most damaging single weather event in Minnesota history. Three of the six tornadoes occurred on the ground simultaneously, and two of them hit the section of Minnesota State Highway 100 (now Interstate 694) and University Avenue in the city of Fridley. Both Fridley tornadoes damaged 1,100 homes and destroyed about 425; total losses reached $14.5 million, $5 million of which was to the Fridley school system.

On May 7, three significant tornadoes hit portions of the Upper Midwest, and beginning early on May 8, a major tornado outbreak affected the Great Plains states, particularly in Nebraska and South Dakota. The outbreak on May 8 produced numerous significant, long-lived tornadoes, including at least three violent tornadoes, two of which were actually long-tracked tornado families. A very large F5 tornado struck Tripp County in South Dakota, and two major F4s tracked across parts of Greeley and Antelope Counties in Nebraska. One of the F4s struck the small village of Primrose, almost totally destroying the settlement, causing possible F5 damage, and killing four people. Additionally, a high-end F3 obliterated a farm in Gregory County, South Dakota, and may have been an F4 as well. Many of the individual tornadoes on May 8 moved north and northwest, an unusual trajectory for supercells in this part of the Great Plains. Many of the long-tracked tornadoes on this date, rather than single tornadoes, were probably tornado families like the two long-lived F4s.

Meteorological synopsis

Temperatures on May 6 were in the upper 70s °F with high dew points, which was considered to be unusual for early May in Minnesota. A strong low pressure area associated with an upper-level system moving in from the southwest and a nearby slow-moving cold front helped spark the storms. These storms formed as training supercells—an atmospheric phenomenon that is extremely rare in Minnesota.  Because of the training, the same general areas from Sibley County through Carver and Hennepin and into northwestern Ramsey counties kept getting the brunt of these cells.

Confirmed tornadoes

May 5

May 6

May 7

May 8

Fridley, Minnesota (two tornadoes)
Two tornadoes touched down in Fridley, just over an hour apart.  In all, six people were killed in the Fridley tornadoes and over 180 were injured. Over 450 homes were destroyed in Fridley, and neighboring Mounds View also sustained heavy damage. A man who called WCCO radio after the first Fridley tornado claimed on air that he had been in his car when the tornado hit and that the tornado blew out his car windows.  Although he is widely believed to have been killed by the second Fridley twister later that night (which did kill a 26-year-old man with a similar name), the caller was actually a teacher at Fridley Junior High School who survived. The tornado also damaged the sign adorning the Heights Theater in Columbia Heights. In all, both Fridley tornadoes damaged 1,100 homes and destroyed about 425; total losses reached $14.5 million, $5 million of which was to the Fridley school system. Photographs for the earlier Deephaven and second Fridley tornado were published in the Minneapolis Tribune (now Star Tribune) newspaper. Early radar images showed the supercells as they moved through the area.

Colome, South Dakota

On May 8th, an F5 tornado passed east of the town of Colome, South Dakota in Tripp County, and became the only tornado to be rated as such in South Dakota's history. On the ground for around 30 miles, the tornado reached a huge mile wide in size and destroyed 7 farms, 3 of which were swept away at F5 intensity. Fortunately, the tornado resulted in no deaths, but there was 1 injury.

Aftermath
The outbreak in Minnesota on May 6 was voted a tie by the Minnesota Climatology Office for the "fifth most significant Minnesota Weather Event of the 20th Century" with the 1965 Mississippi & Minnesota River Flooding.  Considering this outbreak occurred just three weeks after the Palm Sunday tornado outbreak, quick and successful warnings from the U.S. Weather Bureau and transmission from WCCO Radio kept the death toll relatively low. This was also the first time in Minnesota state history where civil defense sirens were used for severe weather purposes.

See also
Climate of Minnesota
List of North American tornadoes and tornado outbreaks

References

Bibliography

Notes

External links
 May 6, 1965 Tornado Outbreak (NWS Twin Cities, MN)
 Radiotapes.com Aircheck recordings of WCCO Radio's tornado coverage from May 6, 1965.
 8mm Home Video of May 6, 1965 Fridley, MN Tornado Damage  YouTube Video.

E
E
E
E
E
E
E
E
E
E
E
E
E
E
E
May 1965 events in the United States